Titan Gym is a 4,000 seat, indoor multi-purpose stadium on the campus of California State University, Fullerton in Fullerton, California.

History and renovations
Titan Gym was built in 1964. Twenty years later, the gym hosted handball competitions for the 1984 Summer Olympics. Ronald Reagan spoke on behalf of the Bush/Quayle campaign in 1988, his last Orange County appearance as President of the United States.

In order to combat wear and tear on Titan Gym, there have been a number of improvements made.  Bleachers, which were used to seat the attendees, have been replaced with chair-back seats.  The floor was completely redesigned and resurfaced.  A new scoreboard was unveiled before the 2003 season and additional balcony seating was added before the start of the 2004 season.

For the CSUF athletes, Titan Gym is also the home practice facility for the basketball and volleyball programs. 

The 2018 U.S. Open, a stop on the 2018 Badminton World Federation Tour, was held at the gym.

Future renovation plans include an expansion of the Titan Gym entrance to include a Titans Hall of Fame as well as a reception area for social functions.

Tenants
Currently, the intercollegiate men's basketball, women's basketball and women's volleyball teams call Titan Gym home. The men's basketball team has played every season at Titan Gym since its opening in 1964.

Gallery

See also
 List of NCAA Division I basketball arenas

References

External links
 Cal State Fullerton athletic facilities
 Titan Gymnasium (CSUF)

1964 establishments in California
Badminton venues
Basketball venues in California
Cal State Fullerton Titans men's basketball
Cal State Fullerton Titans women's basketball
College basketball venues in the United States
College volleyball venues in the United States
College wrestling venues in the United States
Gymnastics venues in California
Handball venues in the United States
Indoor arenas in California
Olympic handball venues
Sports venues completed in 1964
Sports venues in Fullerton, California
Venues of the 1984 Summer Olympics
Volleyball venues in California
Wrestling venues in California